Lot 20 is a township in Queens County, Prince Edward Island, Canada.  It is part of Greenville Parish. Lot 20 was awarded to Theodore Houltain and Thomas Basset in the 1767 land lottery.

Communities

Incorporated municipalities:

 Malpeque Bay

Civic address communities:

 Burlington
 Clinton
 French River
 Grahams Road
 Irishtown
 Long River
 Margate
 Norboro
 Park Corner
 Sea View

References

20
Geography of Queens County, Prince Edward Island